The Lion of Bienservida (also Lion of Villarrodrigo) is an ancient sculpture depicting a lion and a human head put on a plinth. It is exhibited at the Albacete Provincial Museum.

The piece was found in 1893 in the rural estate of Huertas de Bayona, in Villarrodrigo, in the Spanish province of Jaén. It was gifted to the Museum of Albacete in 1932.

However, despite the rough carving,  sees no reason to classify the sculpture as an Iberian (Pre-Roman) artifact, rather considering the lion as art from the Roman republican period. The lion is depicted sheltering a human head (bearded and with moustache) within the claws. Chapa interprets the sculpture in the usual vein of the animal protecting the dead one while at the same time carrying their soul.

References 
Notes

Citations

Bibliography
 
 
 

Archaeological discoveries in Spain
Stone sculptures in Spain
Collection of the Albacete Provincial Museum
Sculptures of lions